Pa, also known as Pare or Akium-Pare, is a Papuan language of Western (Fly) Province, Papua New Guinea.

References

Awin–Pa languages
Languages of Western Province (Papua New Guinea)